Sergio Candelario Sosa (born 15 March 1994) is an Argentine professional footballer who plays as a forward for Berazategui.

Career
Sosa's career started in 2013 with Primera B Metropolitana club Estudiantes, he played in forty-one matches across two seasons (2013–14 and 2014) for the club and scored sixteen goals. In January 2015, Sosa completed a move to Argentine Primera División side Atlético de Rafaela. He made his debut in the league on 15 February against Argentinos Juniors. He made seven more appearances in 2015 but failed to score. Ahead of the 2016 season, Sosa joined Los Andes on loan. He scored one goal in twelve matches before returning to Rafaela.

In January 2017, Sosa joined Primera B Nacional side Independiente Rivadavia on loan. He featured in twelve matches in all competitions. In September 2017, Sosa was loaned to Primera B Metropolitana side Acassuso. He scored his first goal in his eighth appearance, versus Comunicaciones on 17 October.

Sosa joined Berazategui in January 2019.

Career statistics
.

References

External links
 

1994 births
Living people
People from San Martín, Buenos Aires
Argentine footballers
Association football forwards
Primera B Metropolitana players
Primera Nacional players
Argentine Primera División players
Estudiantes de Buenos Aires footballers
Atlético de Rafaela footballers
Club Atlético Los Andes footballers
Independiente Rivadavia footballers
Club Atlético Acassuso footballers
Sportspeople from Buenos Aires Province